Giovanni Checconi (died 1668) was a Roman Catholic prelate who served as Bishop of Pienza (1665–1668).

Biography
Giovanni Checconi was born in Siena, Italy.
On 11 November 1665, he was appointed during the papacy of Pope Alexander VII as Bishop of Pienza.
On 22 November 1665, he was consecrated bishop by Scipione Pannocchieschi d'Elci, Cardinal-Priest of Santa Sabina. 
He served as Bishop of Pienza until his death on 19 March 1668.

References

External links and additional sources
 (for Chronology of Bishops) 
 (for Chronology of Bishops) 

17th-century Italian Roman Catholic bishops
Bishops appointed by Pope Alexander VII
People from Siena
1668 deaths
Bishops of Pienza